Mons Kallentoft (born 15 April 1968), is a Swedish author and journalist. Kallentoft grew up in Ljungsbro outside Linköping and lives in Stockholm. He has written twelve books about Police Inspector Malin Fors. The series is translated in 28 countries. His book Midvinterblod was published as Midwinter Sacrifice in the UK and Australia by Hodder & Stoughton in October 2011, and as Midwinter Blood in US and Canada by Simon & Schuster in June 2012.

Bibliography

The Malin Fors novels
 2007 – Midvinterblod (Midwinter Sacrifice, UK 2011, Midwinter Blood, US 2012, trans. Neil Smith)
 2008 – Sommardöden (Summertime Death, UK 2012, Summer Death, US 2013, trans. Neil Smith)
 2009 – Höstoffer (Autumn Killing, UK 2012, US 2014, trans. Neil Smith)
 2010 – Vårlik (Savage Spring, UK 2013, Spring Remains US 2015, trans. Neil Smith)
 2011 – Den femte årstiden (The Fifth Season, UK 2014, trans. Neil Smith)
 2012 – Vattenänglar (Water Angels)
 2013 – Vindsjälar (Wind Souls)
 2014 – Jordstorm ("Earth Storm")
 2015 – Eldjägarna ("Fire Hunters")
 2016 – Djävulsdoften ("Devil's Scent")
 2017 – Bödelskyssen ("The Executioner's Kiss")
 2018 – Himmelskriket ("A Heaven's Cry")

Stand-alone novels
 Pesetas (2000)
 Marbella Club (2002)
 Fräsch, frisk och spontan (2005)
 Food noir: mat, mord och myter (2004)
 Food Junkie (2013)

Awards 
 Katapultpriset, 2001
 Gourmand World Cookbook Award, 2005
 Hagdahlspriset, 2008
 Premio Espana, 2009

References

External links 
Official webpage

Swedish male writers
1968 births
Living people